The 2007 South Lakeland District Council election took place on 3 May 2007 to elect members of South Lakeland District Council in Cumbria, England. One third of the council was up for election and the Liberal Democrats stayed in overall control of the council.

After the election, the composition of the council was:
Liberal Democrat 34
Conservative 15
Labour 2
Independent 1

Background
At the last election in 2006 the Liberal Democrats gained a majority on the council for the first time. Both they and the Conservatives stood in all of the 17, mainly rural, seats that were being contested in 2007. A Save Our NHS Group stood in 5 seats to campaign against local health cuts, along with 2 candidates from the Labour Party and 1 from the Green Party. Councillors who stood down at the election included 4 Conservatives and 1 Liberal Democrat, Gill Cranwell, vice chair of the council.

Issues in the election included cuts in services, hospital closures and secrecy in local government.

Election result
The results saw the Liberal Democrats remain in control with an increased majority, gaining 3 seats to have 34 councillors. They took the seats of Arnside and Beetham, Crooklands and Windermere Applethwaite from the Conservatives, to leave the Conservatives with 15 councillors. 2 of the gains came in seats where the Conservative councillors had stood down at the election, while in Windermere Applethwaite Jennifer Borer was defeated by 333 votes to 488. Overall turnout in the election was 53.74%.

Ward results

References

2007
2007 English local elections
2000s in Cumbria